The 2021–22 season was the 120th season in the existence of Stade Rennais and the club's 28th consecutive season in the top flight of French football. In addition to the domestic league, Rennes participated in this season's editions of the Coupe de France and the UEFA Europa Conference League.

Players

First-team squad
.

Out on loan

Transfers

In

Out

Pre-season

Competitions

Overall record

Ligue 1

League table

Results summary

Results by round

Matches
The league fixtures were announced on 25 June 2021.

Coupe de France

UEFA Europa Conference League

Play-off round
The draw for the play-off round was held on 2 August 2021.

Group stage

The draw for the group stage was held on 27 August 2021.

Knockout phase

Round of 16
The round of 16 draw was held on 25 February 2022.

Statistics

Appearances and goals

|-
! colspan=14 style=background:#dcdcdc; text-align:center| Goalkeepers

|-
! colspan=14 style=background:#dcdcdc; text-align:center| Defenders

|-
! colspan=14 style=background:#dcdcdc; text-align:center| Midfielders

|-
! colspan=14 style=background:#dcdcdc; text-align:center| Forwards

|-
! colspan=14 style=background:#dcdcdc; text-align:center| Players transferred out during the season

Goalscorers

References

Stade Rennais F.C. seasons
Rennes
2021–22 UEFA Europa Conference League participants seasons